The 1991–92 Philadelphia Flyers season was the team's 25th season in the National Hockey League (NHL). The Flyers hosted the 43rd NHL All-Star Game. They missed the Stanley Cup playoffs for the third consecutive season.

Regular season

Prior to the 1991–92 season, the Flyers acquired Rod Brind'Amour and Dan Quinn from the St. Louis Blues in exchange for Murray Baron and Flyers captain Ron Sutter. Brind'Amour led the Flyers in goals (33), assists (44) and points (77) in his first season with the club. Rick Tocchet was named team captain to replace Sutter. As the Flyers continued to flounder, Paul Holmgren was fired in December and replaced by Bill Dineen, father of Flyer Kevin Dineen. On February 19, the Flyers and the Pittsburgh Penguins made a major five-player deal which featured Tocchet – who never grew comfortably into the role of captain – heading to Pittsburgh and Mark Recchi coming to Philadelphia. Recchi recorded 27 points in his first 22 games as a Flyer, but the team missed the playoffs for the third consecutive year, due in large part to an awful road record (10–26–4).

With Brind'Amour and Quinn in the fold to create more offense, plus a healthy Hextall in net, the Flyers still got off to an 0–3–1 start. After a 4–2 win over New Jersey, the club awakened, trading roughly two wins for every loss and climbing to 8–8–1 following back-to-back 3–1 wins over the Edmonton Oilers and Montreal Canadiens in mid-November.

From there, injuries and poor play from regulars began to doom Paul Holmgren's tenure behind the bench. An eight-game winless streak (0–7–1) effectively put an end to his tenure. Murray Craven was traded to the Hartford Whalers in exchange for the younger Dineen during the run, which included blow-out home losses to the Whalers (7–3 on November 27) and the Penguins (9–3 on November 29). In both home games, the Spectrum crowd loudly chanted "Paul Must Go" during multiple stoppages in play. Flyers fans received their wish on December 4, with the Flyers at 8–14–2, as Bill Dineen took the helm.

The team began his tenure at 4–1–5, but still slipped into last place by late January. A 7–1–2 string brought the club within striking distance of a playoff spot by mid-February, but an inability to win on the road within the division sabotaged their comeback effort. After the three-way deal between the Flyers, Penguins and Kings was completed, the club had an infusion of scoring with Recchi, but it was too late to make up ground in the standings.

A five-game win streak from March 12–22 yielded a 7–6 comeback win over the Capitals in Landover, in which the Flyers scored four times in the third period - but the momentum didn't last as a 2–5–0 finish, compounded by a 12-day National Hockey League Players' Association strike, sent the club into the Patrick Division basement for the second time in three years.

The Flyers struggled on the power play in the regular season, finishing 22nd in power play percentage with 16.55% (68 for 411).

Season standings

Schedule and results

Regular season

|- style="background:#fcf;"
| 1 || October 4 || @ Washington Capitals || 2–5 || 0–1–0 || 0 || 
|- style="background:#ffc;"
| 2 || October 6 || @ Pittsburgh Penguins || 2–2 OT || 0–1–1 || 1 || 
|- style="background:#fcf;"
| 3 || October 10 || Pittsburgh Penguins || 3–6 || 0–2–1 || 1 || 
|- style="background:#fcf;"
| 4 || October 12 || @ New York Islanders || 4–5 || 0–3–1 || 1 || 
|- style="background:#cfc;"
| 5 || October 13 || New Jersey Devils || 4–2 || 1–3–1 || 3 || 
|- style="background:#cfc;"
| 6 || October 17 || Quebec Nordiques || 5–3 || 2–3–1 || 5 || 
|- style="background:#fcf;"
| 7 || October 19 || Montreal Canadiens || 0–1 || 2–4–1 || 5 || 
|- style="background:#cfc;"
| 8 || October 24 || @ Minnesota North Stars || 5–2 || 3–4–1 || 7 || 
|- style="background:#fcf;"
| 9 || October 25 || @ Winnipeg Jets || 0–2 || 3–5–1 || 7 || 
|- style="background:#cfc;"
| 10 || October 31 || San Jose Sharks || 5–2 || 4–5–1 || 9 || 
|-

|- style="background:#fcf;"
| 11 || November 2 || New York Rangers || 2–4 || 4–6–1 || 9 || 
|- style="background:#cfc;"
| 12 || November 5 || @ St. Louis Blues || 4–3 || 5–6–1 || 11 || 
|- style="background:#cfc;"
| 13 || November 7 || Buffalo Sabres || 5–2 || 6–6–1 || 13 || 
|- style="background:#fcf;"
| 14 || November 8 || @ Buffalo Sabres || 3–4 OT || 6–7–1 || 13 || 
|- style="background:#fcf;"
| 15 || November 12 || @ New Jersey Devils || 2–5 || 6–8–1 || 13 || 
|- style="background:#cfc;"
| 16 || November 14 || Edmonton Oilers || 3–1 || 7–8–1 || 15 || 
|- style="background:#cfc;"
| 17 || November 16 || @ Montreal Canadiens || 3–1 || 8–8–1 || 17 || 
|- style="background:#fcf;"
| 18 || November 17 || Winnipeg Jets || 1–2 || 8–9–1 || 17 || 
|- style="background:#fcf;"
| 19 || November 20 || @ Pittsburgh Penguins || 2–5 || 8–10–1 || 17 || 
|- style="background:#ffc;"
| 20 || November 23 || New Jersey Devils || 5–5 OT || 8–10–2 || 18 || 
|- style="background:#fcf;"
| 21 || November 27 || Hartford Whalers || 3–7 || 8–11–2 || 18 || 
|- style="background:#fcf;"
| 22 || November 29 || Pittsburgh Penguins || 3–9 || 8–12–2 || 18 || 
|- style="background:#fcf;"
| 23 || November 30 || @ Pittsburgh Penguins || 1–5 || 8–13–2 || 18 || 
|-

|- style="background:#fcf;"
| 24 || December 2 || @ New York Rangers || 2–4 || 8–14–2 || 18 || 
|- style="background:#fcf;"
| 25 || December 5 || Washington Capitals || 3–6 || 8–15–2 || 18 || 
|- style="background:#cfc;"
| 26 || December 7 || @ Boston Bruins || 5–3 || 9–15–2 || 20 || 
|- style="background:#ffc;"
| 27 || December 8 || New Jersey Devils || 2–2 OT || 9–15–3 || 21 || 
|- style="background:#ffc;"
| 28 || December 12 || Toronto Maple Leafs || 1–1 OT || 9–15–4 || 22 || 
|- style="background:#ffc;"
| 29 || December 14 || Chicago Blackhawks || 1–1 OT || 9–15–5 || 23 || 
|- style="background:#ffc;"
| 30 || December 15 || @ Chicago Blackhawks || 4–4 OT || 9–15–6 || 24 || 
|- style="background:#fcf;"
| 31 || December 18 || @ New York Rangers || 3–6 || 9–16–6 || 24 || 
|- style="background:#cfc;"
| 32 || December 19 || New York Islanders || 6–2 || 10–16–6 || 26 || 
|- style="background:#cfc;"
| 33 || December 21 || @ Minnesota North Stars || 3–0 || 11–16–6 || 28 || 
|- style="background:#cfc;"
| 34 || December 22 || Washington Capitals || 4–3 OT || 12–16–6 || 30 || 
|- style="background:#ffc;"
| 35 || December 27 || @ Vancouver Canucks || 1–1 OT || 12–16–7 || 31 || 
|- style="background:#fcf;"
| 36 || December 28 || @ Calgary Flames || 1–5 || 12–17–7 || 31 || 
|-

|- style="background:#fcf;"
| 37 || January 3 || @ San Jose Sharks || 1–3 || 12–18–7 || 31 || 
|- style="background:#fcf;"
| 38 || January 4 || @ Los Angeles Kings || 3–7 || 12–19–7 || 31 || 
|- style="background:#ffc;"
| 39 || January 7 || Buffalo Sabres || 5–5 OT || 12–19–8 || 32 || 
|- style="background:#cfc;"
| 40 || January 9 || Los Angeles Kings || 5–2 || 13–19–8 || 34 || 
|- style="background:#fcf;"
| 41 || January 11 || @ Boston Bruins || 1–5 || 13–20–8 || 34 || 
|- style="background:#cfc;"
| 42 || January 12 || New York Islanders || 4–3 || 14–20–8 || 36 || 
|- style="background:#ffc;"
| 43 || January 14 || Chicago Blackhawks || 1–1 OT || 14–20–9 || 37 || 
|- style="background:#fcf;"
| 44 || January 16 || @ New York Islanders || 3–4 || 14–21–9 || 37 || 
|- style="background:#fcf;"
| 45 || January 21 || @ Detroit Red Wings || 3–7 || 14–22–9 || 37 || 
|- style="background:#fcf;"
| 46 || January 23 || Winnipeg Jets || 0–1 || 14–23–9 || 37 || 
|- style="background:#fcf;"
| 47 || January 25 || @ Toronto Maple Leafs || 4–6 || 14–24–9 || 37 || 
|- style="background:#cfc;"
| 48 || January 28 || Washington Capitals || 3–2 || 15–24–9 || 39 || 
|- style="background:#cfc;"
| 49 || January 30 || Minnesota North Stars || 5–3 || 16–24–9 || 41 || 
|-

|- style="background:#ffc;"
| 50 || February 1 || @ New York Islanders || 5–5 OT || 16–24–10 || 42 || 
|- style="background:#cfc;"
| 51 || February 2 || St. Louis Blues || 5–1 || 17–24–10 || 44 || 
|- style="background:#fcf;"
| 52 || February 4 || @ New Jersey Devils || 1–3 || 17–25–10 || 44 || 
|- style="background:#cfc;"
| 53 || February 6 || Boston Bruins || 5–1 || 18–25–10 || 46 || 
|- style="background:#cfc;"
| 54 || February 8 || @ Quebec Nordiques || 3–0 || 19–25–10 || 48 || 
|- style="background:#cfc;"
| 55 || February 13 || Quebec Nordiques || 3–2 || 20–25–10 || 50 || 
|- style="background:#cfc;"
| 56 || February 15 || Edmonton Oilers || 8–5 || 21–25–10 || 52 || 
|- style="background:#ffc;"
| 57 || February 16 || Pittsburgh Penguins || 3–3 OT || 21–25–11 || 53 || 
|- style="background:#fcf;"
| 58 || February 18 || @ New Jersey Devils || 3–4 OT || 21–26–11 || 53 || 
|- style="background:#fcf;"
| 59 || February 22 || @ Washington Capitals || 5–7 || 21–27–11 || 53 || 
|- style="background:#fcf;"
| 60 || February 23 || @ New York Rangers || 1–2 OT || 21–28–11 || 53 || 
|- style="background:#cfc;"
| 61 || February 25 || New York Islanders || 4–1 || 22–28–11 || 55 || 
|- style="background:#cfc;"
| 62 || February 27 || @ Calgary Flames || 3–0 || 23–28–11 || 57 || 
|- style="background:#fcf;"
| 63 || February 28 || @ Edmonton Oilers || 2–4 || 23–29–11 || 57 || 
|-

|- style="background:#cfc;"
| 64 || March 1 || @ San Jose Sharks || 1–0 || 24–29–11 || 59 || 
|- style="background:#fcf;"
| 65 || March 3 || @ Los Angeles Kings || 1–4 || 24–30–11 || 59 || 
|- style="background:#cfc;"
| 66 || March 7 || New York Rangers || 5–4 || 25–30–11 || 61 || 
|- style="background:#fcf;"
| 67 || March 8 || Vancouver Canucks || 3–7 || 25–31–11 || 61 || 
|- style="background:#fcf;"
| 68 || March 10 || @ New York Islanders || 2–5 || 25–32–11 || 61 || 
|- style="background:#cfc;"
| 69 || March 12 || Calgary Flames || 5–4 OT || 26–32–11 || 63 || 
|- style="background:#cfc;"
| 70 || March 14 || Washington Capitals || 3–1 || 27–32–11 || 65 || 
|- style="background:#cfc;"
| 71 || March 18 || @ Montreal Canadiens || 4–3 || 28–32–11 || 67 || 
|- style="background:#cfc;"
| 72 || March 20 || @ Washington Capitals || 7–6 || 29–32–11 || 69 || 
|- style="background:#cfc;"
| 73 || March 22 || Detroit Red Wings || 4–3 || 30–32–11 || 71 || 
|- style="background:#fcf;"
| 74 || March 24 || New York Rangers || 3–4 || 30–33–11 || 71 || 
|- style="background:#fcf;"
| 75 || March 25 || @ New York Rangers || 1–4 || 30–34–11 || 71 || 
|- style="background:#cfc;"
| 76 || March 29 || New Jersey Devils || 5–4 || 31–34–11 || 73 || 
|- style="background:#fcf;"
| 77 || March 31 || @ Pittsburgh Penguins || 5–6 || 31–35–11 || 73 || 
|-

|- style="background:#fcf;"
| 78 || April 12 || @ Hartford Whalers || 2–4 || 31–36–11 || 73 || 
|- style="background:#cfc;"
| 79 || April 13 || Toronto Maple Leafs || 6–2 || 32–36–11 || 75 || 
|- style="background:#fcf;"
| 80 || April 15 || Hartford Whalers || 3–4 OT || 32–37–11 || 75 || 
|-

|-
| Legend:

Player statistics

Scoring
 Position abbreviations: C = Center; D = Defense; G = Goaltender; LW = Left Wing; RW = Right Wing
  = Joined team via a transaction (e.g., trade, waivers, signing) during the season. Stats reflect time with the Flyers only.
  = Left team via a transaction (e.g., trade, waivers, release) during the season. Stats reflect time with the Flyers only.

Goaltending
  = Left team via a transaction (e.g., trade, waivers, release) during the season. Stats reflect time with the Flyers only.

Awards and records

Awards

Records

Among the team records set during the 1991–92 season was a four-game tie streak from December 8 to December 15, tying a team record dating back to the 1968–69 season. The Flyers 26 road losses is a single season franchise high.

The 1991–92 season was Mark Howe’s tenth and final season with the Flyers. Howe holds the regular season career marks among Flyers defensemen for goals (138), assists (342), and points (480). He also holds the same playoff marks for assists (45) and points (53).

Transactions
The Flyers were involved in the following transactions from May 26, 1991, the day after the deciding game of the 1991 Stanley Cup Finals, through June 1, 1992, the day of the deciding game of the 1992 Stanley Cup Finals.

Trades

Players acquired

Players lost

Signings

Draft picks

NHL Entry Draft
Philadelphia's picks at the 1991 NHL Entry Draft, which was held at the Buffalo Memorial Auditorium in Buffalo, New York, on June 22, 1991. The Flyers traded their second-round pick, 28th overall, to the Montreal Canadiens for Mark Pederson on March 5, 1991. They also traded their fourth-round pick, 72nd overall, and Jay Wells to the Buffalo Sabres for Kevin Maguire and the Sabres' 1990 second-round pick on March 5, 1990, and their eight-round pick, 160th overall, and Kevin Maguire to the Toronto Maple Leafs for the Maple Leafs' 1990 third-round pick on June 16, 1990.

NHL Supplemental Draft
Philadelphia's picks at the 1991 NHL Supplemental Draft.

Farm teams
The Flyers were affiliated with the Hershey Bears of the American Hockey League.

Notes

References
General
 
 
 
Specific

External links
 

1991–92 NHL season by team
1991–92 in American ice hockey by team
1991
1991
Philadelphia
Philadelphia